Washburn Municipal Airport  is a public airport located four miles (6.5 km) north of the central business district of Washburn, in McLean County, North Dakota, United States. It is owned by the Washburn Airport Authority.

Facilities and aircraft

For the 12-month period ending July 31, 2007, the airport had 1,700 aircraft operations: 76% general aviation, 18% air taxi, and 6% military.

References

External links

Airports in North Dakota
Buildings and structures in McLean County, North Dakota
Transportation in McLean County, North Dakota